Dancing at the Harvest Moon is a 2002 American made-for-television romantic drama film starring Jacqueline Bisset, Valerie Harper and Eric Mabius. Directed by Bobby Roth, it is based on K.C. McKinnon's novel of the same name.

Plot
Maggie, a professor of English literature, is fast approaching her silver wedding anniversary. But her world is shattered upon discovering that her husband, Tom, has been repeatedly adulterous during their marriage and now intends to marry his younger mistress. Facing divorce, she retreats to the tranquility of her hometown, where she met her first love, Patrick, decades earlier. Patrick has long since died, and the club where they danced together—the Harvest Moon—is closed and in disrepair.  She seizes upon the idea of buying and restoring the club again—with the help of a young carpenter/woodworker, John, who turns out to be Patrick's son.  Soon the attraction between John and Maggie is hard to deny.  However, Maggie can't stop thinking of the obstacles between them, including his young age, his current girlfriend and, most critically, whether her feelings for John are sincere or only a projection of her long-ago love for his father.  All is finally revealed once the Harvest Moon is open again.

Cast
 Jacqueline Bisset as Maggie Weber
 Kristen Kerr as Young Maggie
 Eric Mabius as John Keats Fleming
 Susan Anspach as Julia
 Nan Martin as Harriet Finnigan
 Eugene Roche as Gil Finnigan
 Nick Mancuso as Tom Webber
 Carmen Argenziano as Paul Stanton
 Bonnie Root as Diane Webber
 Valerie Harper as Claire
Cari Shayne as Amy
 Rob Nilsson as Dean Jim Rogers
 Navi Rawat as Jennifer
 Gina Gallego as TV Anchor
 Josh Holland as Patrick

Reception
Andy Webb from The Movie Scene gave the film three out of five stars and wrote: "What this all boils down to is that "Dancing at the Harvest Moon" is pretty much what you would expect from a made for TV romantic melodrama with lots of soft focus, romantic scenes and not a great amount of depth. But it is enjoyable with a nice take on the age difference relationship scenario with an added element to make it a little less obvious." David Parkinson from Radio Times gave it two out of five stars, stating: "KC McKinnon's bestseller is the source for this lachrymose melodrama, in which Jacqueline Bisset proves once again that she lacks the intensity and range of contemporaries like Charlotte Rampling."

References

External links

2002 television films
2002 films
2002 romantic drama films
American romantic drama films
CBS network films
Films directed by Bobby Roth
Films scored by Christopher Franke
American drama television films
2000s English-language films
2000s American films